The Phoenix is an Irish political and current affairs magazine, established in 1983 by John Mulcahy. Inspired by the British magazine Private Eye  Since 1984, the magazine has been edited by Paddy Prendeville.   The publication is generally fortnightly, with a larger annual issue each December.

History and operations
The magazine was launched in January 1983. It was established by journalist and publisher John Mulcahy, who oversaw its operations until 2007. The name Phoenix is a reference to its "emergence from the ashes" of two of Mulcahy's previous publications. These were the republican political magazine Hibernia, which ceased publishing in 1980 after a libel action, and the Sunday Tribune newspaper, which first collapsed financially in 1982.

Published by a company named Penfield Enterprises Ltd., and based on Baggot Street, the magazine had an ABC-audited circulation of 19,014 for 2004 and 18,268 in 2007.

The primary editor of the magazine is Paddy Prendiville, who took the role about a year after the magazine was started

The magazine secures much of its material from "insider" sources, and promotes contact with its Goldhawk phone line.

Layout and style
Features in the magazine include a news column; detailed profiles ("Pillars of Society" and "The Young Bloods"); "Affairs of the Nation", which looks at political scandals; "Bog Cuttings" which consists of humorous and unusual events outside Dublin (often bizarre court cases), "Hush Hush" and "On the beat", which deals with security and intelligence matters; and a satirical section, "Craic and Codology". It also has an extensive financial column, "Moneybags".

Like Private Eye, the cover features a photo montage with a speech bubble, putting ironic or humorous comments into the mouths of the famous in response to topical events. Other features include an "Apology" section (where the magazine offers an ersatz apology for the failings or success of some person or event), "That Menu in Full", the use of ("That's enough of this. -Ed" type interjections) and their derivatives, and the Christmas Gift lists, where implausible gifts with ridiculous features are offered for sale.

In contrast to Private Eye, the Phoenix is printed on magazine stock rather than newsprint, and uses colour, including photography, quite extensively.

Positions

The Workers' Party was a frequent target of satire and investigation, in its 1980s heyday, over its funding methods, which resulted in John Mulcahy receiving threats from the Official IRA. In the late 2000s, it was highly critical of the Corrib gas pipeline and supported the Shell to Sea and Pobal Chill Chomáin campaigns against the laying of the pipeline. It published a supplementary summary and commentary on the Goldstone Report on the siege of Gaza and attacked the actions of the Israeli government over the illegal use of Irish passports in the assassination of Mahmoud al-Mabhouh, and the Gaza flotilla raid. The magazine was highly critical of the 2007–2011 Fianna Fáil–Green Party coalition. It called for the 2011 Irish budget to be defeated and pointed out that the money loaned as part of the EU stability fund would come at the cost of a crippling rate of interest.

See also
 Magill
 Waterford Whispers News
 Private Eye
 Village (magazine)
 The Hibernia Magazine

References and footnotes

External links
 
 ABC Data

Biweekly magazines
Irish republican magazines
Magazines established in 1983
Magazines published in the Republic of Ireland
Mass media in Dublin (city)
Political magazines published in Ireland
Satirical magazines published in Ireland